Archaeological Ensemble of Tárraco is inscribed as UNESCO world heritage site since 2000. It is situated in Tarragona.

List of monuments 
It consists of the following monuments:

References 

 
Archaeological sites in Catalonia
Phoenician colonies in Spain
Mediterranean port cities and towns in Spain
Coloniae (Roman)
Roman sites in Spain
World Heritage Sites in Spain
Cultural tourism in Spain